The Chillout Project: The Lounge Story is the second volume of Anton Ramos' The Chillout Project compilation series.

Track listing
 Way Out West - Stealth
 Dzihan and Kamien - Colores
 Aramoabar - Winter Pageant
 Mo Horizon - Foto Viva
 Elak - Remember Me
 Sven Van Hees - Tsunami (Inside My Soul)
 Be Noir - Wake Up With Me
 Groove Armada - My Friend
 Hacienda - Late Lounge Lover
 The Dining Room - Sei Tu
 Rank 1 - Such Is Life
 Club 8 - Love In December
 Kinobe - Grass Roots Horizon
 Feature Cast - Salt
 Blue States - Walkabout
 Chris Coco - 1975
 The New Deal - Exciting New Direction
 Hyplar - Slow Departure

2001 compilation albums
The Chillout Project albums